M. Maurice Hawkesworth (born February 23, 1960 in South Bend, Indiana, United States) is an American producer, multimedia artist, songwriter and former A&R manager for the Danish record label Mega Records.

Early career
Hawkesworth moved to Europe in the mid-1980s. As an artist he exhibited his paintings at Den Fri's kunstnersefterårsudstillingen (Artist Censored Fall Exhibit) in 1988, 1989 and 1990. He produced several successful posters, one of which is featured in the Hoover Institution.

Mega Records
In August 1992, Hawkesworth co-ordinated the production of Ace of Base's debut album, Happy Nation (US version The Sign), together with John Ballard at Tuff Studio in Gothenburg, Sweden. The same month, he co-ordinated artist Leila K's, debut album with Denniz Pop which was launched with the single "Open Sesame". It was a Top 10 in seven countries. Hawkesworth also designed the cover and artwork for "Open Sesame", which featured his painting and photography.

Hawkesworth's A&R credits include discovering and signing Herbie Crichlow. Hawkesworth initiated the re-write of the Crichlow song, "Clap Your", which became the English boy band 5ive's debut hit, "Slam Dunk The Funk", which debuted at number 10 in the UK Singles Chart.

Other signings by Hawkesworth included the Norwegian Stella Getz, written and produced in part by Mikkel Eriksen, who would later become half of the production duo Stargate. Also signed was Solveig Sandnes, whose hit single "Marie" topped the sales charts in Japan. Hawkesworth co-wrote the song and coordinated the A&R bringing on board Tore Johansson, to produce the Solveig album, Analog.

As video commissioner, Hawkesworth helped place over 20 videos on pan European MTV, such as Ace of Base ("All That She Wants", "The Sign", "Lucky Love", "Don't Turn Around", "Life is a Flower"), Leila K ("Open Sesame", "Ca Plane pour Moi", "Slow Motion"), and Stella Getz ("Friends") amongst others.

1999 to present
After leaving Mega Records, Hawkesworth formed the independent record label, Invisible Wave Records (aka Iwave Records). Among the most notable signings on Iwave Records were A Kid Hereafter, Windermere, Said the Shark and Some Allpass. During his projects at Iwave Records, Hawkesworth worked with Finnish musician and producer Jori Sjöroos, writing lyrics for Fu-Tourist and Magenta Skycode, releasing IIIII (known as Five Bars) and the EMMA (Finnish Grammy) award winning album, Relief.

Hawkesworth also composed the soundtrack to All About Anna, produced by Innocent Pictures in association with Zentropa. The soundtrack received an AVN nomination for best soundtrack of the year in 2007.

Songwriting credits

Leila K: Manic Panic – Album – A&R by Maurice Hawkesworth co-producer following tracks
Cue Club – co-written w/Leila K/Agami/Klewe/Pedersen
Its 2 Die For – co-written w/Leila K/Agami/Klewe/Pedersen
I’m Coming To You – co-written w/Leila K/Klewe/Pedersen

Solveig Sandnes: Analog – Album – A&R by Maurice Hawkesworth – Produced/Arranged by Tore Johansson
Detective – co-written w/Solveig Sandnes
What About My Life – co-written w/Solveig Sandnes
You Can Look Around – co-written w/Solveig Sandnes
Living Out Of Your Pocket – co-written w/Solveig Sandnes
Time Machine – co-written w/Solveig Sandnes
Marie(Marie,Marie) – co-written w/Solveig Sandnes
Someone To Use – co-written w/Solveig Sandnes/Carsten Kragenlund
Houdini – co-written w/Solveig Sandnes/Tore Johansson
She Knows What She Wants – co-written w/Solveig Sandnes
On A Day Like Today – co-written w/Solveig Sandnes
My Man – co-written w/Solveig Sandnes
Daylight Dream – co-written w/Solveig Sandnes/Haxholm

Soma Allpass: Lucky Angel – Album – produced by Maurice Hawkesworth
Lucky Angel
Soft As A Rock – co-written w/Soma Allpass
Balance – co-written w/Soma Allpass
Well, Well, Well
AOK
Green
Open Up – co-written w/Soma Allpass
It’s That Simple – co-written w/Soma Allpass

Soma Allpass: Sway – Album
All I Am – co-written w/Soma Allpass
Butterfly – co-written w/Soma Allpass
Spring – co-written w/Soma Allpass
It’s All Good – co-written w/Soma Allpass
Performer – co-written w/Soma Allpass

A Kid Hereafter: Rich Freedom Flavour – Album-A&R and Vocals produced by Maurice Hawkesworth
Hollywood Conspiracy – co-written w/Frederik Thaae
Secret Service – co-written w/Frederik Thaae
Never Too Late – co-written w/Frederik Thaae
Superficial Star – co-written w/Frederik Thaae
Seven Days Later – co-written w/Frederik Thaae
Hip Girls – co-written w/Frederik Thaae
Play Drums – co-written w/Frederik Thaae
Reggae Dreamgirl – co-written w/Frederik Thaae
I Love You More Than Anything – co-written w/Frederik Thaae
Nasty Thoughts – co-written w/Frederik Thaae
Military Waiver – co-written w/Frederik Thaae

A Kid Hereafter: Yo – Album-A&R by Maurice Hawkesworth
Yo – co-written w/Frederik Thaae
Girly Pie – co-written w/Frederik Thaae
Don Wannabe – co-written w/Frederik Thaae
Zero Is My Favorite Number – co-written w/Frederik Thaae
The Circuits Of Your Mind – co-written w/Frederik Thaae
Paris- co-written w/Frederik Thaae
Defenders Of The Faith – co-written w/Frederik Thaae
Men On Emotional Oceans – co-written w/Frederik Thaae
We Are Western – co-written w/Frederik Thaae
Compressed And Compiled – co-written w/Frederik Thaae
Viagra Wars – co-written w/Frederik Thaae
Teenage God – co-written w/Frederik Thaae
Particles Of Joy And Music – co-written w/Frederik Thaae
Hey I Really Like Your Band – co-written w/Frederik Thaae
Homemade Drum Machine – co-written w/Frederik Thaae

A Kid Hereafter: In The Grinding Light
Mutha Model – co-written w/Frederik Thaae/Hans Moller
Q&A – co-written w/Frederik Thaae/Hans Moller/Manoj Ramdas
Hitbot – co-written w/Frederik Thaae/Manoj Ramdas
Baby You’re a cloud – co-written w/Frederik Thaae/Hans Moller/Anders Rasmussen
Shut Up Shut UP Shut Up – co-written w/Frederik Thaae
Footguts – co-written w/Frederik Thaae / Manoj Ramdas
Slaves to the Truth – co-written w/ Anders Rasmussen
The Light Itself Is Alive – co-written w/Anders Rasmussen
The Samurai – co-written w/Frederik Thaae/Hans Moller/Anders Rasmussen/ Manoj Ramdas
Mad Arms – co-written w/Frederik Thaae/Hans Moller/ Manoj Ramdas
Good Good Bad Friend – co-written w/Frederik Thaae/Hans Moller
Sunblox – co-written w/Frederik Thaae
Wave Of Money Fish – co-written w/Frederik Thaae/ Manoj Ramdas
Sunloop – co-written w/Frederik Thaae/Anders Rasmussen
Be Kind To Greater Men – co-written w/Frederik Thaae
Yes I – co-written w/Frederik Thaae
Happy Slappy – co-written w/Frederik Thaae/Anders Rasmussen

Magenta Skycode: IIIII – album
Hands Burn – co-written w/Jori Sjöroos
People – co-written w/Jori Sjöroos
Compassion – co-written w/Jori Sjöroos
Open Air – co-written w/Jori Sjöroos
Pleasure Of Love – co-written w/Jori Sjöroos
I know You’re sleeping With Your Dolls – co-written w/Jori Sjöroos
Go Outside Again – co-written w/Jori Sjöroos
Luvher Oh Hater – co-written w/Jori Sjöroos
Red Eyes – co-written w/Jori Sjöroos
This Empty Crow – co-written w/Jori Sjöroos

Magenta Skycode: Relief – album
The Simple Pleasures – co-written w/Jori Sjöroos
Kipling – co-written w/Jori Sjöroos
Night Falls On The Rifle – co-written w/Jori Sjöroos
Sometimes – co-written w/Jori Sjöroos
Trains Are Leaving The Yard – co-written w/Jori Sjöroos
The Old World – co-written w/Jori Sjöroos
Escaping Outdoors – co-written w/Jori Sjöroos
Montag – co-written w/Jori Sjöroos
We're Going To Climb – co-written w/Jori Sjöroos

Fu-Tourist: The Universe Is For Us
You Come Alive – co-written w/Jori Sjöroos
Remedy – co-written w/Jori Sjöroos
Out Of Your Head – co-written w/Jori Sjöroos
Getting To Know You – co-written w/Jori Sjöroos

PMMP: Kovemmat kädet – kumipainos – Album
Kumivirsi- co-written w/Jori Sjöroos/Paula Vesala/Mira Luoti

Windermere: The World Is Here-album produced by Kim Oxlund and Maurice Hawkesworth
Somehow – co-written w/Kim Oxlund/T homas Hansen/Jacob Skjoldborg/Hans Kjelstrup
Trailer Park – co-written w/Kim Oxlund/T homas Hansen/Jacob Skjoldborg/Hans Kjelstrup
Unspoken – co-written w/Kim Oxlund/T homas Hansen/Jacob Skjoldborg/Hans Kjelstrup

Maria Køhnke: Collector – album
Building a Bridge (arranged by Kohnke, Bech)
Cardboard Heart – co-written w/Maria Kohnke
One Plus One Is Zero – co-written w/Maria Kohnke
Silent Soldier – co-written w/Maria Kohnke

Marvellous: Just In Time – Album produced by Taz and Maurice Hawkesworth
Rescue me- co-written w/Thomas Skydsgaard
Don’t Stop co-written w/Thomas Skydsgaard/Mette Arhoj
Outlaw co-written w/Thomas Skydsgaard/Mette Arhoj
No Matter co-written w/Thomas Skydsgaard/Mette Arhoj/Martin Wolff
The Way Things Are co-written w/Thomas Skydsgaard/Michael Houberg
Just in Time co-written w/Thomas Skydsgaard/Mette Arhoj
What’s the Difference co-written w/Thomas Skydsgaard
Kill The Radio co-written w/Thomas Skydsgaard/Mette Arhoj

All About Anna – Feature Film – score and songs produced by Maurice Hawkesworth
Birds of a Feather (All the Way)
All About Anna

References

External links
Iwave Records homepage

1960 births
Living people
Songwriters from Indiana
American film score composers
American male film score composers
American male songwriters